Sand Springs is a city in Osage, Creek and Tulsa counties in the U.S. state of Oklahoma. A western suburb of Tulsa, it is located predominantly in Tulsa County. The population was 19,874 in the 2020 U. S. Census, an increase of 5.1 percent from the figure of 18,906 recorded in 2010.

History
The city was founded in 1911, by philanthropist Charles Page, a wealthy businessman in Oklahoma. He envisioned Sand Springs as a haven for orphans and widows. Page helped found and develop Sand Springs as a model city that included all components of a total community.

Page bought 160 acres of land in Tulsa County in 1908, intending to build a home for orphan children. The first 27 children, who had been abandoned by the Hook & Anchor Orphanage in Tulsa, were housed in a tent. This was soon replaced by a frame building large enough to house 50 children.

Page decided to form a model community, to be called Sand Springs, on land west of the children's home. He offered free land to any person who wished to move there, and a $20,000 bonus (the amount varied and he also offered free utilities) to companies that would relocate there. In 1911, Page created the Sand Springs Railway, an interurban connecting Sand Springs to Tulsa. The townsite was laid out the same year. Sand Springs was incorporated as a city in 1912, with a population of 400.

In 1911, Page also built the Sand Springs Power Plant, on the southeast corner of Main Street and Morrow Road. It anchored an area that Page intended to use for industrial development. Several significant additions were made to the facility, and it was the sole source of electric power for Sand Springs until 1947.

Some of the earliest manufacturing industries were: Kerr Glass Manufacturing; Commander Mills, Kerr, Hubbard and Kelley Lamp, and Chimney; Southwest Box Company; Empire Chandelier Company; and Sinclair Prairie Refining Company. Medical and social welfare institutions other than the Sand Springs Home included the Oakwood Sanitorium for nervous and mental diseases, Poole Hospital, the Salvation Army Maternity Home, and the Sand Springs School for the Deaf. Sand Springs became a center of glass production in Oklahoma. Kerr Glass Manufacturing moved to Sand Springs from Chicago in 1913. It and the Alexander H. Kerr company, which made fruit jars, were the only glass companies remaining in business as recently as 1955. In 1965, Sand Springs annexed Prattville, on the south side of the Arkansas River, an event that would explain the large jump in population in the 1960s.

Sand Springs Children's Home is still operating, caring for school-age children in a family-style setting, and with an Independent Living program for graduated students.  The facility supports Camp Charles, which is an eight-acre camp in Grove on Grand Lake, where the kids get to camp, cookout, swim, ski and take boat rides. The Charles Page Family Village, formerly known as the Widow's colony, provides duplex housing to 110 mothers and their children at no cost for rent, utilities or home maintenance.

An EF2 tornado hit Sand Springs on March 25, 2015, killing one resident, injuring 30 citizens, and damaging 50 mobile homes.

On November 26, 2018, Clyde Boyd Middle School had a CO leak. The leak started sometime during the morning. Between 11:15 a.m. and 12:58 p.m., five students went home ill, and between 1:15 to 1:35, seven more students became sick. At approximately 2:27, an announcement on the intercom instructed all the students to "go to the new gym". Many students went to hospital from carbon monoxide poisoning. "There was no evidence of the presence of carbon monoxide in the 6th Grade Center". Over 50 students were sent to nearby hospitals. The school didn't have carbon monoxide detectors at the time, which the district said: "it'll resolve". The school was closed for several days while the problem was fixed.  The district has now installed proper carbon monoxide detectors.

Geography
Sand Springs is located at  (36.1398102, -96.1088911). According to the United States Census Bureau, the city has a total area of 21.0 square miles (54.3 km), of which 18.7 square miles (48.4 km) is land and 2.3 square miles (5.9 km) (10.84%) is water. It is roughly located in the western section of Tulsa County and the southern section of Osage County and has a small sliver within Creek County's boundaries.

Demographics

As of the census of 2000, there were 17,451 people, 6,564 households, and 4,870 families residing in the city. The population density was 934.2 people per square mile (360.7/km). There were 6,979 housing units at an average density of 373.6 per square mile (144.3/km). The racial makeup of the city as of 2020 Census was 81.5% White, 2.0% African American, 8.1% Native American, 0.8% Asian, 0.02% Pacific Islander, 0.47% from other races, and 6.6% from two or more races. Hispanic or Latino of any race were 4.8% of the population.

There were 6,564 households, out of which 38.1% had children under the age of 18 living with them, 58.3% were married couples living together, 12.3% had a female householder with no husband present, and 25.8% were non-families. 22.7% of all households were made up of individuals, and 10.2% had someone living alone who was 65 years of age or older. The average household size was 2.59 and the average family size was 3.05.

In the city, the population was spread out, with 28.4% under the age of 18, 8.3% from 18 to 24, 28.9% from 25 to 44, 22.2% from 45 to 64, and 12.2% who were 65 years of age or older. The median age was 35 years. For every 100 females, there were 92.7 males. For every 100 females age 18 and over, there were 87.0 males.

The median income for a household in the city was $40,380, and the median income for a family was $47,258. Males had a median income of $38,120 versus $25,373 for females. The per capita income for the city was $18,193. About 6.7% of families and 9.1% of the population were below the poverty line, including 11.6% of those under age 18 and 7.6% of those age 65 or over.

Economy
The economy of Sand Springs is largely focused on promoting small businesses. It has a very active chamber of commerce.

According to the Encyclopedia of Oklahoma History & Culture, the most significant businesses in 2000 were: Webco Industries, Sheffield Steel Corporation, Rader Diagnostic Center, Smith-Fibercast, Cust-O-Fab, Piping Companies Incorporated, and Baker Petrolite.

Government

Sand Springs has a council-manager form of government. In Sand Springs, the city manager serves as the chief executive officer, the mayor serves as the chairman of the board, and the city council serves as the board of directors. 

The city council has seven council members, each elected to a three-year term.  The mayor and vice mayor are elected annually by the council. The seven council members represent each of the city's six wards; one member serves in an at-large position. The city manager can appoint a city clerk with the approval of the city council. The city clerk is responsible for preparing and maintaining the minutes of all city council meetings.

The current city manager is Mike Carter, and the current city clerk is Janice Almy.

Sports
Although no major sports team is located in Sand Springs, many sporting opportunities are found in the city, including their Softball, baseball, and Soccer Complexes. 

The complexes include the Jerry Adair Complex for baseball. Whilst the Roger G. Bush Complex operates for Soccer. Softball takes place within the William Ramsey Softball Complex and features "5 fields w/lights, bleachers, playground, restrooms, and concessions".

Each year, Around Halloween, the Charles Page High School softball and baseball teams don Halloween costumes for the annual Monster Ball, and the money raised benefits the Sand Springs Special Olympic athletes. "It’s a game of softball but there are some rule changes. Baseball players must bat the opposite of their dominant hand, and there is an unlimited amount of positions on the field. The outfield could have 20 outfielders at any given time".

Many Sports are played through an athletic team from Charles Page High School. Sand Springs has a multitude of Youth Sports that include Baseball, Basketball, Tennis, Football, Wrestling, Track, and others. Many of the sports are either in a Varsity team, Junior Varsity team, or both. 

Sand Springs holds itself to a BMX Track. The facility features a 2-acre moto-cross style bicycle track with lighting, playground, and concessions. The BMX Track began operating in July 2000, and is now the only BMX track in the Tulsa metro, and one of the only 3 tracks in Oklahoma. After massive flooding happened in late May 2019, in Sand Springs, the BMX Track had been flooded. As several parts of it were damaged by the flooding. They did eventually fix the parts of the track that needed repairing. The BMX park had to sell fireworks and partner with other companies to get it all done. They also had a BMX expert help them rebuild the course to the standards of the organization. The BMX track had its grand re-opening in Mid-July of that year.

Many of the sports are occasionally hosted in the Case Community Park through a youth sports program for the community. Which the park receives privileged use of the park space for each operational sport.

Parks and recreation
Case Community Center is a 26,000-square-foot multi-purpose facility capable of hosting a variety of events, and includes a variety of amenities such as basketball, walking track, weight equipment, table tennis, and gaming stations.

Case Community Park includes walking trails, family park areas, a bmx track, a skate park, and splash pads.

The Keystone Ancient Forest features hiking trails in a classic Oklahoma cross timbers forest with 500-year-old cedars and 300-year-old post oak trees, all inside a 1,360-acre nature preserve owned by the City of Sand Springs and protected by a conservation easement held by The Nature Conservancy.  As of 2021, the Forest had a newly opened million-dollar visitor center, an additional walking trail, and expanded hiking hours.  On July 15, 2021, the Forest was the 138th overall, but the first in Oklahoma, to be inducted into the Old-Growth Forest Network, a national organization trying to preserve at least one forest in every county in the United States that can sustain a forest, estimated to be 2,370 counties.    

The Canyons at Blackjack Ridge is a public 18-hole golf course and driving range in the hills north of Sand Springs.

Sand Springs Senior Citizens Center provides games of pool, bingo, cards, and even dances for senior citizens.  Free lunches are provided weekdays.

The Sand Springs Cultural and Historical Museum is located in the historic art-deco Page Memorial Library Building, and promotes cultural heritage and the arts.

Keystone State Park and Keystone Lake are immediately to the west of town.

Skiatook Lake is immediately to the north of town.

Historical sites
 
The following are NRHP-listed sites in Sand Springs:
Fort Arbuckle Site, a/k/a Old Fort Arbuckle (west of Sand Springs)
Page Memorial Library (6 E. Broadway)
Sand Springs Power Plant (221 S. Main St.)

Transportation
US Route 412 and Oklahoma State Highway 51 are the major east–west highways through town.  Oklahoma State Highway 97 runs north–south.

William R. Pogue Municipal Airport (ICAO identifier KOWP, FAA identifier OWP), owned by the City of Sand Springs, has a paved 5,800-foot-long by 100-foot-wide runway, that is located 4 miles northwest of the central business area of the city, and serves mostly general aviation aircraft.

For commercial air traffic, Tulsa International Airport is about a 20-minute drive to the east-northeast.

Education
The Sand Springs Public School District is the largest employer in the city.  It contains five elementary schools, one middle school, and two High Schools (one public and one private). 
 Charles Page High School
 Clyde Boyd Middle School
 Charles Page High School Freshman Academy
 Angus Valley Elementary School
 Harry T. Pratt Elementary School
 Limestone Elementary School
 Garfield Elementary School
 Northwoods Elementary School
 Sixth Grade Center
 Early Childhood Center
 Page Academy (alternative)

There are also four private Christian schools in Sand Springs.
 Amazing Grace Christian Academy
 Heritage Baptist School
 Landmark Christian Academy
 Moriah Christian Academy

Media
Sand Springs has one print newspaper, the Sand Springs Leader. It is published weekly on Thursday.  On April 21, 2015, the Tulsa World announced that its parent company BH Media, a division of Berkshire Hathaway, the Omaha-based investment holding company led by billionaire Warren Buffett, had purchased several suburban newspapers, including the Sand Springs Leader.

Sand Springs also has an online-only news source, Sandite Pride News, which specializes in Sand Springs sports coverage.

Notable people

 Jerry Adair (1936–1987), professional baseball player
 Michael Bowie (b. 1991), professional football player and 2013 Super Bowl winner
 Woody Crumbo (1912–1989), American Indian artist, flutist, and dancer
 Daton Fix (b. 1998), freestyle and folkstyle wrestler, four-time undefeated state wrestling champion, national champion, Pan-American champion, Junior World Champion, Junior Olympic Silver Medalist, and Big 12 Champion
 Neal Hallford (b. 1966), game designer, author, and film producer
 Sam Harris (b. 1961), Tony-nominated actor and singer who was Male Vocalist champion of the first season of Star Search
 Marques Haynes (1926–2015), Harlem Globetrotters player
 Charles Page (1860–1926), oilman, founder of Sand Springs
 Cindy Pickett (b. 1947), actress
 William R. Pogue (1930–2014), Skylab astronaut, author, and pilot
 Robert D. Simms (1926–2008), native of Sand Springs, attorney, judge, associate justice of Oklahoma Supreme Court
 Mae Young (1923–2014), professional wrestler
 Jadine Nollan (b. 1958), politician, Oklahoma House of Representatives from the 66th district since 2010

Notes

References

External links
 City of Sand Springs

Cities in Tulsa County, Oklahoma
Cities in Osage County, Oklahoma
Cities in Creek County, Oklahoma
Cities in Oklahoma
Tulsa metropolitan area
Oklahoma populated places on the Arkansas River
Populated places established in 1911
1911 establishments in Oklahoma